Korolevsky is a rural locality (a khutor) in Novonikolayevskoye Rural Settlement, Novonikolayevsky District, Volgograd Oblast, Russia. The population was 79 as of 2010.

Geography 
Korolevsky is located 12 km northwest of Novonikolayevsky (the district's administrative centre) by road. Gosplodopitomnik is the nearest rural locality.

References 

Rural localities in Novonikolayevsky District